Global Load Control is a subsidiary company of the Lufthansa Group, and was established in Cape Town, South Africa in 2004. The company provides remote weight and balance and load control services to its parent company Lufthansa as well as other airlines. Global Load Control operates from its three centers in Cape Town, Brno and Istanbul. These three centers handle more than 140 Lufthansa stations and process some 1800 flights a day. Global Load Control's operations center in Cape Town became Lufthansa's first load control center outside of Germany. Before this, Lufthansa maintained two centralized  load control centers in Munich and Frankfurt.

History
2004 : Global Load Control founded by Lufthansa in Cape Town, South Africa
2007 : Second operations center established in Brno, Czech Republic
2009 : Third operations center established in Istanbul, Turkey

Controversy
Lufthansa's decision to open a centralized load control center outside of Germany was unpopular with Lufthansa load controllers based in Frankfurt and Munich as they feared the loss of their jobs. Union involvement for a time prevented long haul flights departing from Germany to be processed by the new load control center in Cape Town.

Lufthansa's move to outsource its load controlling needs to its centers in Cape Town, Istanbul and Brno where motivated by more affordable operations costs. The cost of processing flights outside of Germany are around 30 percent cheaper. Another motivating factor that influenced Lufthansa to outsource its load controlling to Cape Town, Brno and Istanbul was due to the high number of German expatriates and local inhabitants with a good knowledge of German living in these cities.

In 2008 concerns were raised as to the quality of work the Global Load Control center in Cape Town was able to deliver, with one client airline calling for Lufthansa's load control operations for Frankfurt airport to be moved back to Frankfurt. In response to this criticism, Lufthansa has stated that a move towards remote centralized load controlling and from manual loadsheets to electronic loadsheets was in the airlines best interest, and that steps have been taken to address the concerns about quality. Since then, Global Load Control has received its Dekra ISO 9001:2008 certification, and states on its corporate website that it is committed to ...producing a quality service by focusing on the principles of safety, punctuality and economy..., and that its quality management systems are continually reviewed and improved.

References

External links

Lufthansa
Business services companies established in 2004